Paul Marty (1882-1938) was a French military officer, colonial administrator, interpreter and writer on Islam.

Marty was born in Boufarik, Algeria.

Works
 Études sur l'Islam maure. Cheikh Sidïa. Les Fadelia. Les Ida ou Ali, 1916
 Études sur l'Islam au Sénégal, 1917
 L'Islam en Guinée : Fouta-Diallon, 1917
 Études sur l'Islam et les tribus du Soudan, 1918
 Études sur l'Islam et les tribus maures; les Brakna, 1920
 Études sur l'Islam en Côte d'Ivoire, 1922
 Études sur l'Islam au Dahomey : le bas Dahomey, le haut Dahomey, 1926
 L'islam et les tribus dans la colonie du Niger, 1930

References

Further reading
 Pessah Shinar, 'A Major Link between France's Berber Policy in Morocco and its "Policy of Races" in French West Africa: Commandant Paul Marty (1882-1938)', Islamic Law and Society, Vol. 33, pp. 33–62

1882 births
1938 deaths
French colonial governors and administrators
French religious writers
French scholars of Islam